L'Enfant roi is a 1905 opera by Alfred Bruneau to a libretto by Émile Zola.

References

Operas
1905 operas
French-language operas
Operas by Alfred Bruneau